Colletorto is a comune (municipality) of approximately 1,786 inhabitants in the Province of Campobasso in the Italian southern region of Molise, located about  from the capital of the region Campobasso and  from Termoli (CB) sea town with port, railway and highway A14 (Adriatic line).

Geography 
Colletorto is situated on a hill 508 mt above sea level up to colle Crocella (776 m) in the Fortore river valley on the "Monti Frentani".

The town is divided in two parts: the upper part is called "Colle" (Hill) and the lower is named "Terra" with the main road and center "Corso Vittorio Emanuele", crossing the center there is the old town district "Campo dei Fiori" (Field of flowers) with the Parish church of Saint John the Baptist, the palace of marquis Rota (Local council domicile) and the Angioina tower, 25 m tall and built in 1369 by Queen Joanna I of Naples, with views from the terrace on the Gargano mountain (Apulia), the Lesina lake, the Adriatic Sea and the Tremiti Islands.

Near Colletorto is situated the Occhito lake, an artificial lake on the Fortore river that sign the limith with the Apulia region, the lake of Guardialfiera is 25 km away.

Other important rivers on the territory are the torrent of Santa Maria and the Cigno river both branches of the Fortore river.

The hills around Colletorto are divided in forest of oaks, Mediterranean maquis, olive trees and fields of cereals and other agricultural products.

Colletorto borders the following municipalities: Carlantino, Casalnuovo Monterotaro, San Giuliano di Puglia, Sant'Elia a Pianisi.

Main sights

 Angevine Tower. Built in 1369 by Queen Joanna I of Naples. It is the main monument of Colletorto. Standing at 25 meters, it was built on an old Norman castle of whose old walls are still visible. Since 1959 it is a possession of the local council, donated by a private family and the last restoration was in 2012. Today it's the symbol of the town and there are many initiatives and events related to this historical monument. 
Palazzo Rota (18th century), now the Town Hall. The "Palazzo Marchesale" was built in the 18th century on the remains of the ancient castle to which the Tower belongs by the Marquis Bartolomeo Rota, who in those times reigned over the town. It has two entrances overlooking two different streets of Colletorto. On the main facade overlook the square where is the main church "Chiesa di San Giovanni Battista". 
Parish Church of Saint John the Baptist  (1730). The church has a single central nave, there are no chapels; the niches of the saints are placed under the arches of the side walls, with an altar in front. Inside the church, there is a canvas by Paolo Gamba dated 1751 "The Holy Family" and a painting on wood from the 1600s by the famous painter and architect Il Zincaro, Antonio Solaro, "La Madonna della Purità", already present also in the ancient church. In the church are present also the relics of Saint Theodore, Saint Victorin, Saint Clementine and Saint Gioconda. 
Monastery and Church of Saint Alfonso de' Liguori (1728). It was built at the expense of the Marquis Bartolomeo Rota, lord of Colletorto with the approval of the Bishop of Larino of that time, Monsignor Tria. Inside the Monastery there are statues by Paolo Saverio Di Zinno and painting by Placido Flaxis. The church suffered serious damage caused by the 2002 Molise earthquake. The church has been completely restored.
Church of Purgatory (1776 with the Royal administrative order of the king of the Two Sicilies Ferdinand IV), now deconsecrated. It is located at the end of the main street in the area of the ancient city walls. Today is used as a conference and exhibition room. It represents the entrance to the ancient part of the town through two old doors "Campo dei Fiori" and "Porta Nuova". The Church has a large civic clock, one of the largest in the region, placed between two small bell towers. On the portal, there is a skull, reported in bas-relief which had the aim of calling the devoted people to show correct behaviour. 
Chapel of Our Lady of Loreto, situated on a hill 3 km away from Colletorto, surrounded by olive trees. It was built by Monsignor Persio Caracci in 1638. The church underwent a restoration in the 1990s. 
Chapel of Saint Rocco, situated 2 km away from Colletorto, in the cemetery.

Economy 
The economy of Colletorto is mainly based on agriculture, producing cereals and especially extra virgin olive oil of excellent quality.

The "Oliva nera di Colletorto" is a native tree of Colletorto and his oil is necessary to produce the "DOP Molise". The municipality, driven by the desire to enhance and make known the quality of the oil produced in the countryside of Colletorto, joins to the National Association of the City of Oil. In the countryside, there are about 250,000 plants that produce around 30,000 quintals of olives per year. 

On the territory are present many oil mills, one paper factory and private workshops.

Under construction there is a health center for elderly persons.

Transport 
 
Colletorto is connected by public bus to the nearest towns and the mains in the Province of Campobasso. 
 
The closest train station is Bonefro-Santa Croce station 14 km away on the regional line Termoli–Venafro railway.

Culture 
The city has many fairs and festivals, notably those of "Fuochi di Sant'Antonio" (17 January) and Saint John (29 August). These include parties and religious processions. The first is a very ancient and particular festival of Colletorto that mixes sacred and profane and it marks the beginning of the carnival. It consists in the preparation of bonfires by each quarter of the town that celebrates with typical food, drinks and music until the morning around the fire. The second is the patron saint's festival. Thanks to the geographical position of the town of Colletorto, in the days close to the summer solstice, it's possible to see the sun rising over the sea towards the Gargano. According to a belief, looking in that direction on the morning of June 24th it's possible to see the head of St. John the Baptist.

Twin towns 
 Saint-Yrieix-sur-Charente, France
 Bari, Italy
 Pano Lefkara, Cyprus
 Xghajra, Malta 
 Alsónémedi, Hungary
 Pelplin, Poland

References

Cities and towns in Molise